Norman Hogg, Baron Hogg of Cumbernauld CBE, DL, JP, LLD, FSA Scot. (12 March 1938 – 8 October 2008) was a Scottish Labour politician.

Educated at Ruthrieston Secondary School in Aberdeen, he worked for Aberdeen Town Council from 1953 to 1967 and then as a District Officer for NALGO from 1967 to 1979.  His father, also Norman Hogg was the Lord Provost of Aberdeen from 1964 to 1967 and he was made a Deputy Lieutenant of Aberdeen in 1970.  At the 1979 general election, he was elected as Member of Parliament for Dunbartonshire East, defeating the Scottish National Party's Margaret Bain.

When his constituency was abolished in boundary changes for the 1983 general election, he was elected for the new Cumbernauld and Kilsyth constituency, which he represented at Westminster until he stood down at the 1997 general election.

During his time in the House of Commons he was a member of the Select Committee on Scottish Affairs from 1979 to 1982, Chairman of the Scottish Parliamentary Labour Group in 1981–82, Scottish Labour Whip in 1982–83, Deputy Chief Opposition Whip from 1983 to 1987, Scottish Affairs Spokesman in 1987–88, and a Member of the Public Accounts Committee in 1991–92.

Hogg was created a life peer as Baron Hogg of Cumbernauld, of Cumbernauld in the County of North Lanarkshire on 24 September 1997.  He was a Member of the House of Lords Delegated Powers and Regulatory Reform Committee from 1999 to 2002 and was Chairman of the Scottish Peers Association from 2002 and a Deputy Speaker of the House of Lords from 2002.

Hogg was also appointed Lord High Commissioner to the General Assembly of the Church of Scotland in 1998 and 1999.

Hogg died after a long illness on 8 October 2008, at the age of 70.

References

External links 
 

1938 births
2008 deaths
Scottish Labour MPs
Hogg of Cumbernauld
Life peers created by Elizabeth II
Members of the Parliament of the United Kingdom for Scottish constituencies
UK MPs 1979–1983
UK MPs 1983–1987
UK MPs 1987–1992
UK MPs 1992–1997
Lords High Commissioner to the General Assembly of the Church of Scotland
Deputy Lieutenants of Aberdeen
Lord Provosts of Aberdeen
Fellows of the Society of Antiquaries of Scotland
20th-century antiquarians